This is a list of episodes for the 1993–94 television series The Untouchables, starring Tom Amandes as Eliot Ness.

Series overview

Episodes

Season 1: 1993

Season 2: 1993–94

References
 

The Untouchables
Untouchables (1993 TV series)